Gary Winkel is an environmental psychologist noted for his contribution to the establishment of the Environment and Behavior, a journal seen as an indication of the recent growth of Environmental Psychology as a field. He is a professor of Environmental Psychology at the Graduate Center of the City University of New York.

Education and career 
Winkel received his Ph.D. in psychology at the University of Washington with a minor in quantitative methods. After receiving his degree, he served as an assistant professor of Architecture and Urban Planning at the University of Washington and was involved in research on museum and exhibit design as well as a project concerned with the redevelopment of downtown Seattle, Washington.  In a study undertaken with Geoffrey Hayward, Winkel observed people in New York City subway stations to investigate the causes of congestion and suggested improvements to different elements in the public space. During this period, he also worked jointly with Philip Thiel and Francis Ventre on the development of the first interdisciplinary journal focused on person/environment relationships. The journal was called Environment and Behavior and served as its first editor in 1969, continuing until 1980. Winkel maintained that the jit was intended to provide a platform for the discussion of the relationships between physical environment and behavior.

In 1968, Professor Winkel joined the Environmental Psychology Program at the Graduate Center of the City University of New York. There, in collaboration with William Ittelson, Harold Proshansky, and Leanne Rivlin, he was the co-author of the first textbook in environmental psychology titled Introduction to Environmental Psychology. His research interests moved in the direction of hospital design and he worked for seven years as a research and design consultant to Bellevue Hospital in New York City. Subsequently, he began working with Professor Susan Saegert of the Environmental Psychology Program on housing and community related research which has continued until the present. In addition to his interests in housing research, Professor Winkel has focused on methodological and statistical issues related to field research in environmental psychology.

Selected bibliography

Books

Journal articles

References

External links 
 CUNY

21st-century American psychologists
Environmental psychologists
Living people
New Urbanism communities
Year of birth missing (living people)
Graduate Center, CUNY faculty
University of Washington alumni